The 2018 CDMX Open was a professional tennis tournament played on clay courts. It was the first edition of the tournament which was part of the 2018 ATP Challenger Tour. It took place in Mexico City, Mexico between 9 and 15 April 2018.

Singles main-draw entrants

Seeds

 1 Rankings are as of 2 April 2018.

Other entrants
The following players received wildcards into the singles main draw:
  Lucas Gómez
  Sebastian Korda
  Luis Patiño
  Manuel Sánchez

The following player received entry into the singles main draw as a special exempt:
  Carlos Berlocq

The following players received entry from the qualifying draw:
  Andrea Basso
  José Hernández-Fernández
  Austin Krajicek
  Juan Ignacio Londero

Champions

Singles

 Juan Ignacio Londero def.  Roberto Quiroz 6–1, 6–3.

Doubles

 Yannick Hanfmann /  Kevin Krawietz def.  Luke Bambridge /  Jonny O'Mara 6–2, 7–6(7–3).

References

2018 ATP Challenger Tour